is a Japanese professional shogi player ranked 9-dan. He is a former  and Ōza major title holder.

Early life
Fukusaki was born on December 6, 1959, in Moriguchi, Osaka. He entered the Japan Shogi Association's apprentice school under the guidance of shogi professional  at the rank of 5-kyū in 1975. He was promoted to 1-dan in 1976 and obtained full professional status and the rank of 4-dan in October 1978.

Shogi professional
In 1979, Fukusaki won the 3rd  tournament for his first championship as a professional.

Fukusaki first appearance in a major title match came in 1986 when he challenged Kunio Yonenaga for the 25th  title. Fukusaki won the match 4 games to 2 for his first major title. The following year, however, he was unsuccessful in his first title match defense, losing to Michio Takahashi 4 games to none.

Fukusaki's next appearance in a major title match came in 1991 when he challenged Kōji Tanigawa for the 39th Ōza title. Fukusaki defeated Tanigawa 3 games to 2, but once again was unable to defend his title the following year, this time losing to Yoshiharu Habu.

On March 8, 2012, Fukusaki defeated Kenji Kobayashi in  a Ryūō Class 4 game to become the 44th professional to win 600 official games.

Promotion history
Fukusaki's promotion history  is as follows:

 5-kyū: 1975
 1-dan: 1976
 4-dan: October 11, 1978
 5-dan: April 1, 1980
 6-dan: April 1, 1981
 7-dan: April 1, 1982
 8-dan: May 26, 1990
 9-dan: October 28, 2005

Titles and other championships
Fukusaki has appeared in major title matches a total of four times and has won two titles. In addition to major titles, Fukusaki has won one other shogi championship during his career.

Awards and honors
Fukusaki received the Japan Shogi Association Annual Shogi Awards for "Best New Player" and "Best Winning Percentage" in 1979, and for "Distinguished Service" in 1986. He also received the association's "25 Years Service Award" in 2003 in recognition of being an active professional for twenty-five years, and the "Shogi Honor Award" in 2008 in recognition of winning 600 official games as a professional.

Personal life
Fukusaki is married to former female shogi professional .

References

External links
ShogiHub: Professional Player Info · Fukuzaki, Bungo [sic]

Japanese shogi players
Living people
Professional shogi players
Professional shogi players from Osaka Prefecture
Tenth Dan
Ōza (shogi)
1959 births
People from Moriguchi, Osaka